Fennia can refer to:

 An old Latin name for Finland, along with Finnia, Finningia and most often used Finlandia that originates from an old conception that people known as Fenni in Tacitus' Germania were Finns
 Fennia (journal), a scientific geography journal
 MS Fennia, a passenger ferry
 Fennia Group, a Finnish insurance group